Schizotypal personality disorder (StPD or SPD), also known as schizotypal disorder, is a cluster A personality disorder. DSM classification describes the disorder specifically as a personality disorder characterized by thought disorder, paranoia, a characteristic form of social anxiety, derealization, transient psychosis, and unconventional beliefs. People with this disorder feel pronounced discomfort in forming and maintaining social connections with other people, primarily due to the belief that other people harbor negative thoughts and views about them. Peculiar speech mannerisms and socially unexpected modes of dress are also characteristic. Schizotypal people may react oddly in conversations, not respond, or talk to themselves. They frequently interpret situations as being strange or having unusual meanings for them; paranormal and superstitious beliefs are common. Schizotypal people usually disagree with the suggestion that their thoughts and behaviors are a 'disorder' and seek medical attention for depression or anxiety instead. Schizotypal personality disorder occurs in approximately 3% of the general population and is more commonly diagnosed in males.

Epidemiology 
The reported prevalence of StPD in community studies ranges from 1.37% in a Norwegian sample, to 4.6% in an American sample. A large American study found a lifetime prevalence of 3.9%, with somewhat higher rates among men (4.2%) than women (3.7%). It may be uncommon in clinical populations, with reported rates of up to 1.9%. It has been estimated to be somewhere between 0% and 5.2% of the general population. Together with other cluster A personality disorders, it is also very common among homeless people who show up at drop-in centers, according to a 2008 New York study. The study did not address homeless people who do not show up at drop-in centers. Schizotypal disorder may be overdiagnosed in Russia and other post-Soviet states.

Prognosis 
People with StPD usually had symptoms of schizotypal personality disorder in childhood. Traits of StPD usually remain consistently present over time, although can fluctuate greatly in severity and stability. DSM characterizes StPD as having nine major symptoms: ideas of reference, odd/magical beliefs, social anxiety, not having close friends, odd or eccentric behavior, odd speech, unusual perceptions, suspiciousness, and constricted affect. There may be gender differences in the symptomology of men and women with StPD. Women with the disorder might be more likely to have less severe cognitive deficits, and more severe social anxiety and magical thinking. People with StPD are more likely to only have a high school education, to be unemployed, and to have significant functional impairment. The two traits of StPD which are least likely to change are paranoia and abnormal experiences.

Etiology

Genetic 
People who have relatives with schizotypy, mood disorders, or other disorders on the Schizophrenia spectrum are at a higher likelihood of developing StPD. Although environmental factors likely play an important role in the onset of the disorder. The COMT Val158Met polymorphism and its Val or Met allele are suspected to be associated with Schizotypal personality disorder. This is because these genes affect dopamine production in the brain. Which is a neurochemical thought to be associated with schizotypal traits. The gene may also contribute to decreased levels of gray matter in the prefrontal cortex. This may lead to impaired capacities for decision-making, speech, cognitive flexibility, and altered perceptual experiences. The rs1006737 polymorphism of the CACNA1C gene is also believed to have a part in schizotypal symptoms. It may lead to a significantly increased physiological response to stress through the cortisol awakening response in the brain. It may also negatively affect reward processing in the brain and lead to anhedonia or depression in patients. These factors possibly lead to the development of Schizotypal traits. The zinc-finger protein ZNF804A likely affects the levels of paranoia, anxiety, and ideas of reference in StPD. This gene is also thought to negatively impact attention in people with StPD. It may lead to an increased level of white matter volume in the frontal lobe. Another gene, the NOTCH4 is thought to relate to Schizophrenia spectrum disorders. It can lead to disruptions in the occipital cortex, and therefore symptoms of schizotypy. The GLRA1 and the p250GAP genes are also potentially associated with StPD. It may lead to abnormally low levels of Glutamic acids in the NDMA receptors, which impairs memory and learning. StPD may stem from abnormalities in Chromosome 22.

Neurological 
Exposure to influenza during week 23 of gestation is associated with a higher likelihood of developing StPD. Poor nutrition in childhood may also contribute to the onset of StPD by altering the course of brain development. Numerous areas of the brain are thought to be associated with StPD. Higher levels of dopamine in the brain, possibly specifically the D1 receptor, might contribute to the development of StPD. StPD is associated with heightened dopaminergic activity in the striatum. Their symptoms may also stem from higher presynaptic dopamine release. People with StPD may also have decreased volumes of grey or white matter in their caudate nucleus. Which leads to difficulties in speech.  People with StPD likely have a reduced volume in their temporal lobes, possibly specifically the left hemisphere. The reduced levels of gray matter in these areas may be linked to their negative symptoms. Reduced volume of gray or white matter in the superior temporal gyrus or the transverse temporal gyrus are thought to lead to issues with speech, memory, and hallucinations.  Deficits in the gray matter volume of the temporal lobe and prefrontal cortex are likely associated with impairments in cognitive function, sensory processing, speech, executive function, decision-making, and emotional processing present in people with StPD. StPD symptoms may also be influenced by reduced internal capsule, which carries information to the cerebral cortex. People with StPD can also have impairments in the uncinate fasciculus, which connects parts of the limbic system. People with StPD have reduced levels of gray matter in their middle frontal gyrus and Brodmann area 10. Although, not as reduced as patients with Schizophrenia. Possibly preventing them from developing schizophrenia. Increased gyrification in gyri by the cerebellum may lead to dysconnectivity in the brain, and therefore, schizotypal symptoms. They may also have a hyporeactive, or hyperreactive amygdala. As well as hyperactive pituitary glands and putamens. It is also possible that lower capacities for prepulse inhibition plays a role in StPD. Research has suggested that people with StPD can have higher concentrations of Homovanillic acids. Abnormalities in the cave of septum pellucidum may also be present. In people predisposed to the development of Schizophrenia spectrum disorders, the consumption of cannabis can induce the onset of StPD or other disorders with psychotic symptoms.

Environmental 
Unique environmental factors, which differ from shared sibling experiences, have been found to play a role in the development of StPD and its dimensions. There is evidence to suggest that parenting styles, early separation, childhood trauma, and childhood neglect can lead to the development of schizotypal traits. Neglect, abuse, stress, trauma, or family dysfunction during childhood may increase the risk of developing schizotypal personality disorder. There is also evidence indicating that insults in the prenatal environment could affect the development of StPD. Over time, children learn to interpret social cues and respond appropriately but for unknown reasons this process does not work well for people with this disorder. During childhood, people with StPD may have seen little emotional expression from their parents. Another possibility is that they were excessively criticized or felt like they were constantly under threat. Potentially resulting in the onset of social anxiety, strange thinking patterns, and blunted affect present in StPD. Their difficulties in social situations might eventually cause the individual to withdraw from most social interactions, thus leading to asociality. Children with schizotypal symptoms usually are more likely to indulge in internal fantasies, more anxious, socially isolated, and more sensitive to criticism. People with the most severe cases of StPD usually have a combination of childhood trauma and a genetic basis for their condition.

Signs and Symptoms 
StPD is characterized by 5 or more of the following:

   ● Ideas of reference (but not delusions of reference)

   ● Odd beliefs or magical thinking (e.g. the supernatural or special connection or bond to an abuser)

   ● Unusual perceptional experiences (hearing a voice, dissociative experiences, illusions, etc.)

   ● Odd thought and speech (e.g. jumping from one topic to another)

● Eccentric behavior and/or appearance

● Paranoid ideation

    ● Moods and facial expressions that don't match each other or the situation

    ● Few to no close supports

    ● Excessive social anxiety that remains even with familiar people

● Symptoms must have begun by early adulthood

  Differential diagnosis:

   ● Other disorders with psychotic symptoms: (e.g., schizophrenia, bipolar disorder, or depressive disorder with psychotic features)

   ● Paranoid, schizoid, or avoidant personality disorders

● Dissociative Identity Disorder (DID)

Magical ideation 
Odd and magical thinking is common among people with StPD. They are more likely to believe in supernatural phenomena and entities. It is common for people with StPD to experience severe social anxiety and have paranoid ideation. Ideas of reference are common in people with StPD. They can feel as if expressing themselves is dangerous. They may also feel that others are more competent and have deeply entrenched and pervasive insecurities. Strange thinking patterns may be a defense mechanism against these feelings. People with StPD usually have limited levels of self-awareness. They may believe others think of them more negatively than they actually do.

Affect 
Patients with StPD can have difficulties in recognizing their or others' emotions. This can extend to difficulties expressing emotion. They may have limited responses to others' emotions and can be ambivalent. It is common for people with StPD to derive limited joy from activities. People with StPD are typically more socially isolated and disinterested in social situations than most people, although they can be socially active on the internet.  Depersonalization, derealization, boredom, and internal fantasies are common in patients with StPD. Abnormal facial expressions are also common in people with StPD, and they can have aberrant eye movements and difficulty responding to stimuli. They are more prone to substance abuse or suicidal ideation. Another epidemiological study on suicidal behavior in StPD found that, even when accounting for sociodemographic factors, people with StPD were 1.51 times more likely to attempt suicide.

Cognitive impairments 
People with StPD tend to have cognitive impairments. They can have abnormal perceptional and sensory experiences such as illusions. For example, someone with StPD might perceive colors as lighter or darker than others perceive them.  Facial perception may also be difficult for people with Schizotypal personality disorder. They can see others as deformed, may misrecognize them, or can feel as if they are alien to them. People with StPD can have difficulty processing information such as speech or language. They are more likely to speak slowly, with less fluctuation in pitch, and long pauses between speech. Patients with StPD may have a lower odor detection threshold, and can have impaired auditory or olfactory processing.  It is also common for people with StPD to have impaired context processing, which means they can form loose connections between events. In addition, people with StPD can have decreased capacities for multisensory integration or contrast sensitivity, either hyperreactive or impaired reactions to sensory input, slower response times, impaired attention, poorer postural control, and difficulties with decision-making. People with StPD can have difficulties in memory, and may have frequent intrusive memories of events. It is common for people with StPD to feel Déjà vu or as if they can accurately predict future events due to abnormalities in the brain's memory storage.

Treatment

Medication 

StPD is rarely seen as the primary reason for treatment in a clinical setting, but it often occurs as a comorbid finding with other mental disorders. When patients with StPD have prescribed pharmaceuticals, they are usually prescribed antipsychotics, however, the use of neuroleptic drugs in the schizotypal population is in great doubt.  The antipsychotics which show promise as treatments for StPD are olanzapine, risperidone, haloperidol, thiothixene, and fluoxetine. While people with schizotypal personality disorder and other attenuated psychotic-spectrum disorders may have a good outcome with neuroleptics in the short term, long-term follow-up suggests significant impairment in daily functioning compared to schizotypal and even schizophrenic people without antipsychotic drug exposure. Positive, negative, and depressive symptoms were shown to be improved by the used of olanzapine, an antipsychotic. Those with comorbid OCD and StPD were most positively affected by the use of olanzapine, and showed worse outcomes with the use of clomipramine, an antidepressant. Antidepressants are also sometimes prescribed, whether for StPD proper or for comorbid anxiety and depression. However, there is some ambiguity in the efficacy of antidepressants, as many studies have only tested people with StPD and comorbid obsessive-compulsive disorder or borderline personality disorder. They have shown little efficacy for treating dysthymia and anhedonia related to StPD. Both of these medications are the most frequently prescribed medication for StPD, though the use and efficacy of them should be evaluated differently for every case. The use of stimulants has also shown some efficacy, especially for those with worsened cognitive and attentional issues. Patients that suffer from concurrent psychosis should be monitored more closely if stimulants are used as part of their treatment. Other drugs which may be effective include pergolide, guanfacine, and dihydrexidine.

Therapy 
According to Theodore Millon, schizotypal personality disorder is one of the easiest personality disorders to identify but one of the most difficult to treat with psychotherapy. However, it can be used as an effective form of treatment. Cognitive remediation therapy, metacognitive therapy, supportive psychotherapy, and cognitive-behavioral therapy can be effective treatments for the disorder. Increased social interaction with others may be able to help limit symptoms of StPD. Group therapy is recommended for persons with StPD only if the group is well-structured and supportive. Support is especially important for schizotypal patients with predominant paranoid symptoms, because they will have a lot of difficulties even in highly structured groups. Persons with StPD usually consider themselves to be simply eccentric or nonconformist; the degree to which they consider their social nonconformity a problem differs from the degree to which it is considered a problem in psychiatry. It is difficult to gain rapport with people with StPD because increasing familiarity and intimacy usually increase their level of anxiety and discomfort. Therapy for StPD must be flexible to face emergencies or unique challenges.

Diagnosis

Differential diagnosis

Screening 
There are various methods of screening for schizotypal personality. The Schizotypal Personality Questionnaire (SPQ) measures nine traits of StPD using a self-report assessment. The nine traits referenced are Ideas of Reference, Excessive Social Anxiety, Odd Beliefs or Magical Thinking, Unusual Perceptual Experiences, Odd or Eccentric Behavior, No Close Friends, Odd Speech, Constricted Affect, and Suspiciousness. A study found that of the participants who scored in the top 10th percentile of all the SPQ scores, 55% were clinically diagnosed with StPD. It has been adapted into a computerized adaptive version, known as the SPQ-CAT. A method that measures the risk of developing psychosis through self-reports is the Wisconsin Schizotypy Scale (WSS). The WSS divides schizotypal personality traits into 4 scales for Perceptual Aberration, Magical Ideation, Revised Social Anhedonia, and Physical Anhedonia. A comparison of the SPQ and the WSS suggests that these measures should be cautiously used for screening of StPD.

Common comorbidities 

 Antisocial personality disorder
 Bipolar disorder
 Borderline personality disorder
 Dysthymia
 Narcissistic personality disorder
 Obsessive-compulsive disorder 
 Major depressive disorder
 Paranoid personality disorder
 Post-traumatic stress disorder
 Schizoid personality disorder
 Schizophrenia
 Substance use disorders
 Social anxiety disorder
 Dissociative Identity Disorder

See also 

 Boundaries of the mind
 DSM-5 codes (personality disorders)
 Paranoid personality disorder
 Schizoid personality disorder
 Schizotypy
 Dissociative Identity Disorder

References

External links 

Paranoia
Cluster A personality disorders
Schizophrenia